Kanpur Anwarganj is the second-largest railway station in Kanpur Nagar district, Uttar Pradesh, India.

Structure and layout
It has three platforms. It was constructed during the British Raj. It has one big clock on its main building. It is on the Farrukhabad–Kanpur line. Until 2006 it was a metre-gauge station. In 2006 Railway Minister Lalu Prasad Yadav reopened the line as a broad-gauge railway line towards Lucknow. The first station superintendent was Mr. V.N. Pandey. In 2008 a broad-gauge line opened towards Mathura too.

Services
Around 45 trains pass through the station. Some MEMU trains start from here. Kanpur Anwarganj is now linked with some new stations like New Delhi, Mathura, Agra, Jaipur, Gorakhpur, Chapra, Patna, Kolkata, etc. Now Kanpur Anwarganj is one of the main railway stations on the route to Rajasthan and Eastern India.

Trains originating

See also

Lucknow–Kanpur Suburban Railway

References

External links

Railway stations in Kanpur
Allahabad railway division
Railway stations in India opened in 1896